The 2016 OFC Champions League was the 15th edition of the Oceanian Club Championship, Oceania's premier club football tournament organized by the Oceania Football Confederation (OFC), and the 10th season under the current OFC Champions League name. The final stage of the tournament was held in New Zealand for the first time under its current format, with the preliminary stage held in the Cook Islands.

Auckland City were the five-time defending champions, and won their sixth title in a row and eighth overall title with a 3–0 final victory over fellow New Zealand opponents Team Wellington. As the winners of the 2016 OFC Champions League, they qualified as the OFC representative at the 2016 FIFA Club World Cup in Japan (a record eighth Club World Cup appearance). Their sixth consecutive continental club title was also a record, surpassing a tie they previously shared with Real Madrid, who won five consecutive European Cups between 1956 and 1960.

Teams

A total of 15 teams from all 11 OFC member associations entered the competition.
The four associations with the best results in the 2014–15 OFC Champions League (Fiji, New Caledonia, New Zealand, Papua New Guinea) were awarded two berths each in the group stage.
Three other associations (Solomon Islands, Tahiti, Vanuatu) were awarded one berth each in the group stage.
The four developing associations (American Samoa, Cook Islands, Samoa, Tonga) were awarded one berth each in the preliminary stage, with the winner advancing to the group stage.

Schedule
The schedule of the competition was as follows.

Preliminary stage
The preliminary stage was played in Matavera, Cook Islands from 26 to 30 January 2016. The draw for the fixtures was held on 16 November 2015, 15:00 NZDT (UTC+13) at the OFC Headquarters in Auckland, New Zealand. The four teams played each other on a round-robin basis. The winner advanced to the group stage to join the 11 direct entrants.

All times UTC−10.

Group stage
The group stage was played in Auckland, New Zealand from 8 to 17 April 2016. The draw for the group stage was held on 16 November 2015, 15:00 NZDT (UTC+13) at the OFC Headquarters in Auckland, New Zealand. The 12 teams were drawn into three groups of four, with each group containing one team from each of the four pots. The allocation of teams into pots was based on the results of their associations in the previous edition of the OFC Champions League. Teams from the same association could not be drawn into the same group.

In each group, the four teams played each other on a round-robin basis. The group winners and the best runner-up advanced to the semi-finals.

All times UTC+12.

Group A

The match originally ended 1–1. However, Solomon Warriors were later ruled to have forfeited the match for fielding an ineligible player.

The kick-off of Group A matches on matchday 9 were delayed due to heavy rain.

Group B

Group C

Ranking of second-placed teams

Knockout stage
The knockout stage was played in Auckland, New Zealand from 20 to 23 April 2016. The four teams played on a single-elimination basis. The semi-final matchups were:
Winner Group A vs. Best runner-up
Winner Group B vs. Winner Group C

All times UTC+12.

Bracket

Semi-finals

Final

Statistics

Tournament statistics

Top goalscorers

Awards

See also
2016 FIFA Club World Cup

References

External links
2016 OFC Champions League Preliminary, oceaniafootball.com
2016 OFC Champions League, oceaniafootball.com

2016
1
2016 Ofc Champions League